The BBC Four World Cinema Award is an annual prize given out to celebrate the best in world cinema. A shortlist of up to six films is made by the UK's leading critics, film-school heads and festival directors from the foreign language films released in that year in the UK. The winner is selected by a panel of judges whose decision making process is screened as part of the award ceremony, screened live on BBC Four, and since the beginning hosted by Jonathan Ross.

History
2008 was its seventh year, with the BBC Four World Cinema Award ceremony hosted by Jonathan Ross from the BFI Southbank in London. The winner of the 2008 award was announced on 30 January 2008, and the event was broadcast on BBC Four on 2 February 2008.

In 2009, a new Achievement award for an international film-maker of great distinction was added to the ceremony in addition to the existing best film award., which was awarded was given to Werner Herzog. The 2009 award ceremony took place on 27 January 2009, again at the BFI Southbank.

The seventh annual ceremony took place in October 2010.

As the BBC needed to make budgetary cut backs, 2011 was the last BBC Four World Cinema Awards was held.

Award winners

BBC Four World Cinema Award

BBC Four World Cinema Achievement Award
2009 – Werner Herzog
2010 – Bernardo Bertolucci
2011 – Isabelle Huppert

References

External links

BBC Four World Cinema Awards at IMDb

British film awards
World Cinema
Awards established in 2004
Awards disestablished in 2011
2004 establishments in the United Kingdom
2011 disestablishments in the United Kingdom